The Union Labor Party was a San Francisco, California working class political party of the first decade of the 20th century. The organization, which endorsed the doctrine of nativism, rose to prominence in both the labor movement and urban politics in the years after 1901, electing its nominee as Mayor of San Francisco in 1909.

Organizational history

Background 

During the first decade of the 20th century, employers across America made effective use of judicial injunctions to prohibit trade unions from engaging in strikes to win recognition for themselves and wage-and-hour gains for their members. This so-called "open shop drive" put organized labor, concentrated in an array of local and international craft unions joined under the umbrella of the American Federation of Labor, on the defensive.

In San Francisco, one of the most heavily unionized cities in the country, matters came to a head in the summer of 1901 when a local employers' association, the Draymen's Association, locked out the city's unionized teamsters on July 21. The lockout spread to the entire waterfront, which saw the city's transportation essentially shut down.

Strikebreakers were imported by the employers, who were met by force, leading to calls by the employers for police assistance. When police were deployed by the Chief of Police, the city's 14 maritime unions joined together in the City Front Federation and voted to initiate a mass sympathy strike in support of the locked out teamsters, rather than see the teamsters' union crushed. Some 16,000 longshoremen, clerks, packers, and warehouse workers joined the work stoppage on July 30, thereby increasing the volatility of the situation.

San Francisco's Democratic mayor, James D. Phelan, who had been elected thanks in large measure to the support of organized labor, sided with the employers in the battle and gave the Chief of Police authorization to smash the strike. Extreme violence followed, in which picketing workers were clubbed and even shot, resulting in 5 deaths and 336 reported cases of assault. Hundreds more strikers were arrested.

The perceived "treachery" of Mayor Phelan caused San Francisco's organized labor movement to rethink its previous strategy of attempting to elect and influence its "friends" in the Democratic and Republican parties. Instead, the unions sought an independent political organization to elect their own people to positions of power so that the violence of the state would not be turned against them in a future replay of the strike of 1901.

The Union Labor Party was the result of this change of perspective.

Union formed 

On September 5, 1901, approximately 300 delegates representing 68 of San Francisco's unions gathered together in a convention to establish the Union Labor Party of the City and County of San Francisco. The convention approved a platform including a call for the revision of the city charter to curb future intervention by the city administration in labor disputes, a demand for municipal ownership of all public utilities, building more schools and the initiation of the merit system in the promotion of teachers, and the abolition of the poll tax. The platform also contained a frankly nativist demand for the restriction of Asian immigration and the creation of segregated schools for Asian children.

The new political party nominated Eugene E. Schmitz, president of the Musicians' Union, as its candidate for Mayor. He was backed by lawyer and political boss Abe Ruef, who threw his considerable influence behind Schmitz. The union put up a slate of its candidates for all other elected positions. The organization was ultimately endorsed by every San Francisco union with the exception of the local Building Trades Council and was bitterly opposed by every newspaper with the exception of the San Francisco Examiner, owned by William Randolph Hearst.

The election of November 1901 proved a great triumph for the union, with its mayoral candidate winning election by a plurality of over 20,000 votes. Three of its members were elected to the San Francisco Board of Supervisors and the group fell just 50 votes short of electing 3 more.

Immediately after the election, the teamsters' strike was finally settled in favor of the trade unions. Strikebreakers were discharged and the striking unionized workers were reinstated. The Teamsters Union was recognized, the union wage scale initiated, and the 48-hour week established. While the union demand for a closed shop was not immediately granted, the year 1901 nevertheless marked a major victory for organized labor and marked a high-water mark for the trade unions of San Francisco and their Union Labor Party.

The ULP in power 

With City Hall in the hands of the Union Labor Party, San Francisco's trade unions launched a series of successful strikes in 1902. The city's streetcar employees launched a strike to reverse a 1901 wage cut and to win union recognition, an action which snarled San Francisco's internal transportation. The United Railway Company, employer of the streetcar workers, attempted to import strikebreakers, but this time the ULP Mayor of San Francisco prohibited the company's request for a police guard and ordered that no special permits be granted for security guards to carry firearms. Eight days later, the company signed a contract with its employees which granted all of the union's demands.

Despite some misgivings on the part of Samuel Gompers and other national officials of the American Federation of Labor, the ULP continued its electoral success in 1903, when Eugene Schmitz was renominated for Mayor of San Francisco and won re-election by more than 26,000 votes.

Anti-union forces may have been defeated in the elections, but by no means was there an end to their own organizing. In 1904 there came to San Francisco a new organization known as the Citizen's Alliance, headed by Herbert George, one of the city's leaders of the open shop movement. George initially launched the Citizens' Alliance in Denver, Colorado with great success before importing the organization to the less hospitable soil of the city by the bay. By the end of 1904, George's organization claimed a membership of 16,000, including employers pledged to restore "the Americanism of the Open Shop in San Francisco."

In the election of 1905, the Citizens' Alliance sought to fragment the union opposition by launching a puppet organization called the United Labor League. The Citizens' Alliance counted on a split of the labor movement, centered around the conservative Building Trades Council headed by P.H. McCarthy, against which would be pitted a fusion candidate combining the forces of the Republicans and the Democrats under the slogan of "Law and Order."

Contrary to the best-laid plans of the open shop advocates, McCarthy and the previously resistant Building Trades Council united behind Schmitz and the Union Labor Party in the election of 1905, helping him to win a third term of office.

The ULP in retreat 

The year 1907 marked the watershed for the Union Labor Party. In that year, a series of revelations took place detailing graft and corruption in municipal administration, culminating in an investigation and prosecution that showed that the Union Labor Party and the city's Mayor were in the control of political boss Abe Ruef, who received financial kickbacks in the guise of legal fees from public utilities, gambling houses, and houses of prostitution. The fall of Mayor Eugene Schmitz in the midst of the San Francisco Streetcar Strike of 1907 undermined the strike effort, which ended in utter failure after months of violence between the Carmen's Union and out-of-town mercenary strikebreakers.

While little different from the corruption in other major American cities, such as Pittsburgh, Cleveland, Philadelphia, St. Louis, Chicago, and New York, the San Francisco city graft scandal drew deafening wails of criticism from the local and national press, which sought to emphasize an inevitable connection between labor unions and official dishonesty.

The ULP's 1909 platform advocated public ownership of utilities, a new civic auditorium, extensive public works, and a U.S. citizen-only hiring policy. The ULP nominated and elected the conservative P. H. McCarthy of the San Francisco Building Trades Council in the 1909 mayoral election. While McCarthy's administration was largely scandal-free, it suffered from a number of political failures.

Businessmen chose James Rolph, Jr., known as "Sunny Jim", to run against him in 1911. Rolph won that election and the ULP faded from the scene.

References

Further reading 

 Michael Kazin, Barons of Labor. Urbana: University of Illinois Press, 1987.
 Ira Cross, A History of the Labor Movement in California (UC Press 1935).
 Gerald D. Nash, The Influence of Labor on State Policy 1860-1920, 17 Calif. Hist. Quarterly 241-257 (1963)
 Lucile Eaves, A History of California Labor Legislation, With An Introductory Sketch of the San Francisco Labor Movement, University of California Press, 1910.
 Philip Taft, Labor Politics American Style: The California State Federation of Labor (Harvard U. Press 1968)

Political parties established in 1901
1901 establishments in California
Defunct political parties in the United States
History of San Francisco
Labor parties in the United States
Political parties with year of disestablishment missing